The Web of Easter Island is a novel by American writer Donald Wandrei.  It was published by Arkham House in 1948 in an edition of 3,068 copies.  It was the fourth full-length novel to be published by Arkham House.

The Web of Easter Island was first written in 1932 under the title Dead Titans, Waken!.  The manuscript was rejected by several publishers including Harper & Brothers but was eventually revised and published by Arkham House.  It is loosely related to the Cthulhu Mythos (it is dedicated to H. P. Lovecraft) and follows the exploits of Carter E. Graham from England to Easter Island, where ancient horror is discovered and combatted.

Dead Titans, Waken! was edited for re-publication by S.T. Joshi and was to have been issued during the 1990s by Fedogan and Bremer. It was finally published by Centipede Press in a limited edition of 300 copies in March 2012.

External links
  
 Internet Archive

Sources

1948 American novels
Cthulhu Mythos novels
Novels set on islands
Novels set in Easter Island
Weird fiction novels
Arkham House books